Columbus Community Church is a historic church on New York State Route 80 in Columbus, Chenango County, New York. It was built in 1844 and is a one-story rectangular frame building, a low pitched gable roof, and a three-stage bell tower and spire.  It is in the Greek Revival style, with some Gothic Revival features introduced with a remodeling in 1879.

It was added to the National Register of Historic Places in 1986.

References

Churches on the National Register of Historic Places in New York (state)
Churches completed in 1844
19th-century churches in the United States
Churches in Chenango County, New York
National Register of Historic Places in Chenango County, New York